Neopolyptychus compar is a moth of the family Sphingidae. It is known from Brachystegia woodland from Zimbabwe to Mozambique, Zambia, Malawi and south-eastern Tanzania.

The wingspan is 64–83 mm.

The larvae feed on the leaves of Brachystegia spicaeformis.

Subspecies
Neopolyptychus compar compar (Zimbabwe to Mozambique, Zambia, Malawi and south-eastern Tanzania)
Neopolyptychus compar septentrionalis Carcasson, 1968 (coastal areas of Kenya and northern Tanzania)

References

Neopolyptychus
Moths described in 1903
Moths of Africa